Dirk Penkwitz (born 1969 in Pinneberg, Germany) is a German television host.

Penkwitz visited the Axel-Springer-Akademie and hosted Punkt 12, Life! Die Lust zu Leben and Life! - Total verrückt, by  RTL.

Since February 19, 1999, he has been hosting Life! - Total verrückt with Birgit Schrowange.

Since March 10, 2003, he presentates the Super RTL Talkshow clipshow Voll Total.

In 2007, Penkwitz took on hosting of the music-clipshow Alle Hits and the show Guinness World Records - Die verrücktesten Rekorde aus aller Welt.

In 2008, he was backstage at RTL's show Das Supertalent.

References

External links

Dirk Penkwitz on Super RTL

German television personalities
1969 births
Living people
People from Pinneberg